Opera glasses, also known as theater binoculars or Galilean binoculars, are compact, low-power optical magnification devices, usually used at performance events, whose name is derived from traditional use of binoculars at opera performances. Magnification power below 5× is usually desired in these circumstances in order to minimize image shake and maintain a large enough field of view. A magnification of 3× is normally recommended. The design of many modern opera glasses of the ornamental variety is based on the popular lorgnettes of the 19th century.

In addition to the more stereotypical binocular type, folding opera glasses were another common design. They were made mostly of metal and glass, with a leatherette cover for grip and color. Although folding glasses have existed in one form or another since the 1890s, they were perhaps most popular in the mid-20th Century and many from this era are marked "Made in Japan" or, less commonly, "Made in Occupied Japan". The design can still be purchased new, although the most common contemporary designs are now almost entirely plastic.

See also
London Opera Glass Company
Monocular
Spotting scope
Opera
Opera hat
Opera cloak
Opera gloves

References

External links

 Chambers's Encyclopaedia: A Dictionary of Universal Knowledge, Volume 7
 The Opticalia Museum Opera Glasses
 The Encyclopedia Americana, Volume 11
 The History of Opera Glasses

Binoculars
Glasses
Theatre